An aircraft canopy is the transparent enclosure over the cockpit of some types of aircraft. An aircraft canopy provides a controlled and sometimes pressurized environment for the aircraft's occupants, and allows for a greater field of view over a traditional flight deck. A canopy's shape is a compromise designed to minimize aerodynamic drag, while maximizing visibility for pilots and other crewmembers.

History

Very early aircraft had no canopies. The pilots were exposed to the wind and weather, although most flying was done in good weather. Through World War I most aircraft had no canopy, although they often had a small windshield to deflect the prop wash and wind from hitting the pilot in the face. In the 1920s and 1930s, the increasing speed and altitude of airplanes necessitated a fully enclosed cockpit and canopies became more common.

Early canopies were made of numerous pieces of flat glass held in position by a frame and muntins. The muntins reduced visibility, which was especially awkward for military aircraft. Also, glass canopies were much heavier than acrylic canopies, which were first introduced shortly before the Second World War. The acrylic bubble canopy was used on aircraft such as the Supermarine Spitfire and Westland Whirlwind, which gave better all-round visibility and reduced weight. It is still being used on most fighter aircraft.

In the 1970s, US aviation artist Keith Ferris invented a false canopy to paint on the underside of military aircraft, directly underneath the front of the plane, the purpose of which was to camouflage the direction the aircraft is heading. This ruse was inspired by animals and fishes that have similar markings on the head and tail, so they can confuse other creatures. Pilots remain skeptical of this feature, asserting that if the enemy is close enough to see the marking, they are too close to be fooled by it.

Ejection seat system

On many high-performance military aircraft, the canopy is an integral part of the ejection seat system. The pilot cannot be ejected from the aircraft until the canopy is no longer in the path of the ejection seat. In most ejection seat equipped aircraft, the canopy is blown upwards and rearwards by explosive charges. The relative wind then blows the canopy away from the ejection path. However, on some aircraft, such as the McDonnell Douglas AV-8B Harrier II, the pilot may be forced to eject when in a hover, or when going too slow for the relative wind to move the canopy out of the path of the ejection seat. In that situation, the pilot could possibly impact the canopy when ejecting. To overcome that possibility, some aircraft have a thin cord of plastic explosive zig-zagging across the canopy over the pilot's head. In the event of an ejection, the explosive cord is activated first, shattering the canopy. Then the ejection seat and pilot is launched through the shattered canopy.

Construction

Most modern acrylic canopies are vacuum formed. A sheet of acrylic is secured to a female mould, then the entire assembly is heated in an oven until the acrylic is pliable. The air is then removed from the mould and the acrylic sheet is drawn into it, forming the shape of the canopy. The acrylic is then trimmed to the appropriate shape and attached to an aluminum or composite frame. Some one-off canopies are made in a similar fashion, but since a mould would be too time-consuming to make, the acrylic is heated and vacuum formed until it approximates the shape the builder is seeking. This type of construction is less precise, however, and each canopy is unique. If multiple canopies will be needed, a mould is almost always used.

Stealth canopy 
Have Glass is the code name for a series of RCS reduction measures for the F-16 fighter. Its primary aspect is the addition of an indium-tin-oxide layer to the gold tinted cockpit canopy, which is reflective to radar frequencies. An ordinary canopy would let radar signals straight through where they would strike the many edges and corners inside and bounce back strongly to the radar source; the reflective layer dissipates these signals instead. Overall, Have Glass reduces an F-16's RCS (radar-cross section) by 15 percent. The gold tint also reduces glare from the sun to improve visibility for the pilot.

Malcolm Hood

The Malcolm Hood is a type of aircraft canopy originally developed for the Supermarine Spitfire. Its concept proved valuable for other aircraft such as the North American Aviation-produced P-51B & C Mustangs as retrofit items, and standard on later versions of the Vought F4U Corsair, and somewhat emulated on the later models of the Luftwaffe's Focke-Wulf Fw 190 fighter. The canopy was manufactured by the British company R Malcolm & Co which gave its name. Instead of taking a straight line between the canopy frames, the hood was bulged outward. This gave the pilot a better view to the rear.

...the Corsair's initial deficiencies were being worked out on a concurrent basis... The 689th production F4U-1 featured a number of significant changes. The most noticeable was that the cockpit was raised  to improve the pilot's forward view, and a bulged canopy, along the lines of the "Malcolm Hood" used on Spitfires, replaced the original "birdcage" framed canopy to provide better all-round field of view.

Gallery

See also
 Bubble canopy

References